"Renegades" is a song by Japanese rock band One Ok Rock. The song was produced by Jamil Kazmi, written by Takahiro Moriuchi, Ed Sheeran and Masato Hayakawa of Coldrain, and was released on 16 April 2021 as the lead single from the band's tenth studio album Luxury Disease.

The song serves as the main theme for the live action manga, Rurouni Kenshin: The Final.

An acoustic version of "Renegades" was later released onto digital and streaming platforms on 30 July 2021.

Background
A week prior to the release of the single on 9 April 2021, the band shared a 30-second teaser of the music video on YouTube to hype up the release of the single, which would be slated for release on 16 April 2021.

Composition
"Renegades" has been described by critics as being an alternative rock and a pop rock song. The track runs at 154 BPM and is in the key of F minor. It runs for four minutes and 5 seconds. The song was written by Takahiro Moriuchi, Ed Sheeran, Masato Hayakawa, David Pramik, Adam Hawkins and Jin Jin.

According to NME, "Renegades" is all about conveying an urgent message that calls into question about the current state of affairs in the world around us, and this would be how "Renegades" serves as an anthem for renegades who refuse to allow their battles and passions to be ignored. In an interview with J Rock News, Moriuchi would express how the song connects to being the main theme for the Japanese blockbuster Rurouni Kenshin: The Final, in which he would say that "Renegades" relates more to the protagonist than the overarching plot of the film.

"A lightness, love, and hope that shines from within. I think those aspects really connected with our band."

In another interview which was uploaded to the official One Ok Rock YouTube channel, Moriuchi would also explain about how "Renegades" needed to hark back to more of a rock sound in order to properly convey the message of the song, which has lots of anger in it.

"I think we need to trace back to our early intentions. I think anger can only be truly expressed in rock music. So it’s our duty as rock musicians to play rock."

Music video

The music video for "Renegades" was released alongside the single on 16 April 2021, and was directed by Toshi Atsunori. The official video was released on the Fueled by Ramen YouTube channel, while a Japanese version of the video was released simultaneously on the band's official channel.

The video starts off with individuals in desperation, struggling and in complete despair. As the video showcases these individuals, who eventually come together to form "The Renegades" as the song describes. The band performs the song in a different setting altogther to begin with, though as the crowd forms, the cliff face openes up as the renegades walk towards the band and then back the way they came from, with the band following in tow. The frontman, Takahiro Moriuchi, singing the song as well as the other band members performing the song are then suddenly transported to a mountainous region as an artificial sun forms behind them as they sing the rest of the song, calling out to the renegades who walk towards them, before they stare at the sun and watch the band perform the final chorus as the video ends.

The two major differences in the Japanese version of the music video is that there are Japanese subtitles and in the second pre-chorus lyrics "For all the lies and the burden that they put on us / All of the times that they told us to just because" were replaced with "Surikomare nuri kasanerareta / Uso wa bokura wo nomikonda".

The Japanese video for the song surpassed 2 million views within the first 24 hours of being published. By the end of its first week, both videos (Japanese and International) would tally up to a combined total of 7.5 million views.

As of June 2022, the combined total of the two videos tallies up to over 40 million views on YouTube.

Track listing

Personnel
Credits adapted from Tidal.

One Ok Rock

 Takahiro "Taka" Moriuchi – lead vocals, lyrics
 Toru Yamashita – lead guitar
 Ryota Kohama – bass guitar
 Tomoya Kanki – drums

Additional personnel
 Jamil Kazmi – producer
 Dan Lancaster – recording engineer, studio engineer
 Adam Hawkins – mixing, arrangements
 Ted Jensen – mastering
 Rhys May – assistant producer
 Kyle Moorman – production assistant

Charts

Weekly charts

Year-end charts

Certifications

References

External links
 

2021 songs
2021 singles
One Ok Rock songs
Songs written by Takahiro Moriuchi
Songs written by Ed Sheeran
Songs written by Masato Hayakawa
Alternative rock songs
Pop rock songs
Japanese film songs